It's Whateva is the second studio album American hip hop group The Federation. It was released on September 4, 2007 via Warner Bros. Records and Reprise Records, and was entirely produced by Rick Rock. It also features guest appearances from Ca$his, E-40, Marty James, and Snoop Dogg among others. The album peaked at number 60 on the US Billboard Top R&B/Hip-Hop Albums chart and number 23 on the Top Rap Albums chart.

Track listing

Sample credits
"Get Naked You Beezy" contains elements from "The Doggie in the Window" by Patti Page (1953)
"My Rimz" contains elements from "Nite and Day" by Al B. Sure! (1988)

Chart positions

References

External links

It's Whateva album info
It's Whateva article

2007 albums
Albums produced by Rick Rock